Melanie Kuenrath (born 23 February 1999) is an Italian footballer who plays as a midfielder for Trento.

Career

Kuenrath started her career with German second tier side FC Bayern II. In 2021, she signed for Napoli in the Italian top flight. Before the second half of 2021–22, Kuenrath signed for Sammarinese club San Marino Academy.

In 2022, she signed for Trento in Italy.

References

External links

 Melanie Kuenrath at playmakerstats.com

1999 births
2. Frauen-Bundesliga players
Women's association football midfielders
Expatriate women's footballers in Germany
Florentia San Gimignano S.S.D. players
Italian expatriate sportspeople in Germany
Italian expatriate women's footballers
Italian women's footballers
Living people
San Marino Academy players
Serie A (women's football) players
S.S.D. Napoli Femminile players